Homalopteroides stephensoni is a species of the genus Homalopteroides in the family Balitoridae. It can be found in the Kapuas and Mahakam rivers in Borneo.

References

Balitoridae
Fish described in 1932